Clan Ostoja (Moscics) is one of the largest and oldest knightly and heraldic families in Europe, belonging to the Polish nobility. The family is sealed with the Ostoja coat of arms.

The coat of arms of the clan and a vocation 

The coat of arms of the Ostoja clan is one of the oldest family marks of medieval Polish knights. It occurs under the names: Ostoja, Hostoja, Mościc, Ostojczyk, and the name of the clan is Ostoja and Hostoja. This was Probably the calling was an older form of clan identification than the coat of arms.

Image of the Ostoja coat of arms 

 The oldest images from medieval seals: Czcibor, Poznań dean from 1358, Jakusz from Błociszewo, Lviv voivode from 1370, Dobiesław from Koszyce, Kraków landlord from 1381., Scibora of Sciborzyce, the Transylvanian voivode from 1389., Bernard of Gronowice, chancellor of prince Władysław Opolczyk from 1394.
 The oldest images in medieval armorials: the armorial of Bellenville, the armorial of Gelre, the armorial of the Lyncenich, the armorial of Bergshammar, the armorial of the Golden Fleece, the Jewels of Jan Długosz or the chronicle of the Council of Constance.
 The oldest image of the emblem: a relief from the first half of the 13th century on the entrance portal in the southern wall of the nave of the church of St. Nicholas in Wysocice.
 The image and structure of the Ostoja coat of arms until the mid-16th century (according to Prof. J. Szymański): Ostoja (Hostoja, Mościc, exclamation: Hostoja, Ostoja)–in the red field, among two golden moons, shoulder-lengths towards each other, as well as a cavalier cross at the forehead . Helmet with labs with black coating, and the lining, probably gold. Gem: between two golden grips, the dragon's head is black, breathing red flame.
 The image and structure of the Ostoja coat of arms from the second half of the 16th century (according to Prof. J. Szymański): Ostoja–in the red field, among two golden moons, with shoulders towards each other, like a broken sword, a helmet with a crown and labras, probably red with a golden lining. Gem: five ostrich feathers.

Clan history

The origin of the clan 
The origin of the clan and the time when the Ostoja coat of arms was created obscure the darkness of history. Nevertheless, there are some indications that the ancestors of this family (at least some of them) may have come from Eastern Europe. The primary evidence here is the fact that the coat of arms of the Ostoja coat of arms, in its linear structure and style, bears the traces of old proprietary and clan marks of the Great Steppe nomadic peoples (Scythian, Sarmatian, Finno-Ugric, etc.). Prof. Tadeusz Sulimirski, author of the book "Sarmatians", in which he wrote: [...] There are many contradictory views on the origin of Polish coats of arms, none of which is convincing. [...] However, no attention was paid to the striking resemblance of Polish coats of arms to Sarmatian tamgas and the almost identical form. [...] The coats of arms of the Rurkowicz Ruthenians and most of the Polish coats of arms come from them. The confirmation of what Silimirski claimed is the similarity of the Ostoja coat of arms, engraved on the portal of the church of St. Nicholas in Wysocice to the coat of arms of the Iziasławicz family (Rurykowicz), the Połock princes from the 12th century. Jan Długosz (1415–1480), a Polish historian and chronicler, decided that the Ostoja family and its coat of arms are native Polish, including information about them among the 71 oldest Polish families and noble coats of arms. In the work Insignia seu clenodia Regis et Regni Poloniae, he wrote his observation as to the characterological features of the clan: "Ostoja [...] Genus Polonicum loquax et arrogans," which can be translated as: Ostoja [...] Polish family eloquent and audacious or as Bartosz Paprocki explained these words that the ancestors of the Ostoje clan were sometimes talkative and daring.

The legendary origin of the clan and coat of arms 
There are three most famous legends about the creation of the coat of arms and the Ostoja (Moścics) family – Bartosz Paprocki (given in 1578), Szymon Okolski (given in 1642) and Wacław Potocki (given in 1696).

According to the legend written down by Bartosz Paprocki, the beginnings of the family and the Ostoja coat of arms date back to the times of King Bolesław the Bold and concern a brave and cunning knight named Ostoja, who rotted over the water. In one of the military campaigns, he successfully attacked the guard of enemy troops and took prisoners of war. One of them, fearing death, agreed to cooperate with Ostoja and hand over his companions. Thanks to the subversive action of that prisoner of war, the Ostoja soldiers defeated the enemy several times and brought great fame and fame to the army. This is how Ostoja Polska was saved. This version of the legend was also presented, in his own way, by Kasper Niesiecki in "Herbarz Polski".

Another legend was given by Szymon Okolski. According to him, the origins of the Ostoja family should be associated with the journey of Japheth (son of Noah) to Croatia, who often prayed by the moonlight and therefore used his image as his personal sign. A descendant of Japheth – Balthazar, who traveled to Bethlehem with Casper and Melchior, added a star to the family coat of arms, symbolizing the aforementioned journey to the birthplace of Christ. Later Okolski wrote that the descendants of Balthazar who lived in Croatia left their homeland and, together with Czech and Lech, settled in distant lands. The family of Balthazar and Lech also included Ostoja, who participated in the war waged by Bolesław the Bold with pagans. As a sign of his victory, he placed in his family coat of arms, instead of a star, a sword between two moons, thanks to which he became famous.

Wacław Potocki did not believe in the legends presented by Paprocki and Okolski. He had a different idea about the genesis of the family and the Ostoja coat of arms. He wrote: Let whoever will believe, and according to my head, I will place another beginning in Scripture as a Refuge. The heraldry saw the beginning of the family and the Ostoja coat of arms during the migration of the Israelites to Canaan. He referred to the biblical story of Joshua's struggle against the Amorites when the sun and moon were held back so that the leader of the Israelites could defeat his enemies by day. Potocki wrote that hence the two moons in the CoA, which were almost halfway down, a clear sign of the spilling blood, the sword separated the naked ones. Two moons, because in order for the year to stand in its measure, they had to fit two quarters in one night. [...] this Israeli hetman, Joshua prides himself, should be proud of this CoA and those who received castles under his shield of fortresses, fortresses and defenses.

Clan nickname 
The family surname is Scibor (also: Czścibor, Czcibor, Cibor, Czesbor). Many Ostoja families use it with their surnames – Ścibor-Iłowieccy, Ścibor-Bogusławscy, Ścibor-Chełmscy, Ścibor-Jackowscy, Ścibor-Ostaszewscy, Ścibor-Rylscy and others. It is an Old Polish male name that means a fighter for honor, a defender of honor or one who worships a fight. From the earliest times, family members used this name extremely often. Even the names of the two oldest, known to researchers, seats of Ostoja come from the name of Ścibor. These are – Ściborzyce in Małopolska and Ścibor in Kujawy. Kasper Niesiecki wrote about the meaning of this name for the members of the Ostoja clan in "Herbarz Polski": [...] on the old privileges, Sciborów got to read strength (because they had a hereditary name for a long time, which we can see in the Chełmski house today ) peculiarly, however, in the year 1099. Counts from Jabłeczno, counts from Poniedz, and therefore I would infer that this house was earlier in Poland in our country than our writers assumed for it.

The most prominent figure in the Ostoja (Moścics) family bearing the name of Scibor was the son of Mościc from Ściborz, voivode of Gniewkowski – Scibor from Sciborzyce, voivode of Transylvania, Komes of Upper Hungarian counties. His property encompassed half of western Slovakia, including the entire Váh valley. He was sometimes called the little king of Slovakia. It had 31 castles and over 200 estates. Its main seat and property was Beckov Castle in today's Slovakia. From 1362, he lived in Hungary in the immediate vicinity of Louis I of Hungary. After the death of King Louis, he joined the court of Sigismund of Luxemburg. As an influential advisor and friend of the ruler of Hungary, he entered the circle of the most powerful aristocrats of medieval Europe. In addition, he was one of the first members of the Order of the Dragon. He died in 1414 and was buried in the royal chapel in Székesfehérvár.

The oldest historical evidence 
The oldest material testimony to the history of the family is the image of the Ostoja coat of arms, discovered during the conservation works of the church of St. Nicholas in Wysocice. The emblem engraved on the portal of the temple probably comes from the first half of the 13th century. It is known that the completion of the construction of this church was funded by knight Mikołaj from Ściborzyce of the Ostoja coat of arms. Certainly, the rite of the Ostoja coat of arms cannot come from a later period, because the sons of Mikołaj – Strachota and Ścibor sold their father's village in 1252 to the Cistercian monastery in Szczyrzyc and left Ściborzyce and moved to the northern regions of Poland. An important historical memento of the family is also the sale document of Ściborzyce, which is the approval of the transaction by Bolesław the Chaste. The original parchment document is dated 14 May 1252 and its content was published in the Diplomatic Code of Lesser Poland in 1876. It is possible that the ancestor of the above-mentioned heirs of Ściborzyce was the knight Cistebor (Cistibor), who in 1110 offered unum pallium to the Krakow cathedral.

An extremely valuable testimony to the history of the Ostoja family is the Drohiczyn filler from the mid-thirteenth century, with an identification and ownership mark with the emblem of the Ostoja coat of arms. It represented Strachota, son of Mikołaj from Ściborzyce, and was probably stamped in the years 1253–1255. The seal was found in the ruins of the foundations of the former castle in Drohiczyn. The castle belonged to the Duke of Mazovia, Siemowit I, who visited Drohiczyn twice after 1252. Probably Strachota Mikołajewice of Ściborzyce, the prince's adjutant and most trusted knight, accompanied him during those visits to the castle in Drochiczyn.

One of the oldest mementos of the Ostoja family is the seal of the dean of Poznań Czcibor (Ścibor), imprinted in wax, depicting the Ostoja coat of arms. The coat of arms emblem is illegible today, but its description from 1879 has survived – [...] (the seal) shows the emblem of the Ostoja family on a triangular shield; inscription: S'Cztiborii Decani Pozn. Scibor was the dean of the Poznań Cathedral in the years 1356–1363. The document with his seal is in the Archdiocese Archives in Poznań (ref. DK, perg. 81).

There is an image of the seal of Jakusz of Błociszewo, voivode of the Lviv town, showing the coat of arms of Ostoja with the inscription: S. IACUSSI. DE. BLOCISZEWO. The seal was hung on a document issued in 1370. The photo of the seal was published in 1938 by Marian Haisig. The document with the seal was in the Archives of the city of Lviv that year.

The historic ruins of Beckov Castle in Slovakia are a great testimony to the great history of the Ostoja family. From 1388, the stronghold belonged to Ścibor of Ściborzyce, coat of arms of Ostoja. The castle was rebuilt by Ostojczyk in the Gothic style and significantly enlarged. After the death of Ścibor, Beckov passed the path of inheritance to his son, Ścibor Ściborowic. The castle remained in the hands of the family until 1437. An important historical memento of the family is also the perfectly preserved tombstone of Ścibor Ściborowic, which is now kept in the Historical Museum in Budapest.

The precious historical mementoes of the family include the baptismal font with the Ostoja coat of arms in the Church of the Assumption of the Blessed Virgin Mary and Saint Stanisław the Bishop in Bodzentyn, funded by Cardinal Fryderyk Jagiellończyk in 1492. Zygmunt Gloger wrote about this baptismal font in the Old Polish Encyclopedia.

Religious buildings funded by members of the clan 
Below are presented selected examples of historic sacred buildings of historical importance, which were funded by members of the Ostoja (Moscics) family. The oldest building known to historians is the church of St. Nicholas in Wysocice, erected in the first half of the 13th century. The construction of the temple (originally dedicated to the Virgin Mary) was initiated by Bishop Iwo from Końskie, known as Odrowąż. This church was to be his fortress, private chapel. However, in 1229, the bishop unexpectedly died while traveling through Italy. The construction works were continued thanks to the support of Mikołaj from Ściborzyce, Ostoja coat of arms. St. Nicholas was probably dedicated to the Ostojczyk.

Castles, palaces and manors of the clan members 
The seats of the clan members are presented below. The oldest and one of the most magnificent is the well-preserved Orava Castle from the 13th century in the village of Oravský Podzámok in Slovakia. In 1420 it was handed over by King Sigismund of Luxemburg, Scibor Sciborowic, coat of arms Ostoja, son of Ścibor from Ściborzyce.

Famous representatives of the clan 
The history of Ostoja (Moścics) was created (and still is) created by individual members of the family. For this reason, below is a list of known (historically) figures representing the ancestral community throughout the 13th–20th centuries. We can find many outstanding people – scientists, artists, soldiers and clergymen. Among them there are titled persons holding the highest offices – princes (e.g. Marcin Szyszkowski), komes (e.g. Scibor from Sciborzyce), cardinals (e.g. Adam Kozłowiecki), bishops (e.g. Tomasz Ostaszewski), counts (e.g. Józef Andrzej Mikorski), generals (e.g. Tadeusz Błociszewski) and many others. The presented list is certainly incomplete, but it will be supplemented over time.

13th century 

 Mikołaj of Ścibórz (died before 1252) – founder of the church Wysocice, heir of Ściborzyce.
 Scibor Mikołajewic of Sciborzyce (died after 1252) – heir of Sciborzyce, courtier of the Kuyavian prince Kazimierz I.
 Strachota Mikołajewic of Ściborzyce (died after 1261) – heir of Ściborzyce, chamberlain of Masovia, courtier of the Duke of Masovia Siemowit I.

14th century 

 Mikołaj of Ściborz (died around 1315) – heir of the village of Ścibor in Kujawy, ensign of Inowrocław in 1311.
 Wincenty of Košice (died after 1361) – heir of Košice in the mid-14th century.
 Czcibor (Scibor) (died after 1363) – dean of the Poznań Cathedral.
 Jakusz of Błociszewo (died after 1370) – voivode of the Lviv town.
 Mościc of Ściborz (died before 1383) – heir of Ściborz in Kuyavia, voivode of Gniew and the head of Brześć Kujawski from 1368.
 Sągniew née Konary (died after 1386) – heir in Konary in the second half of the 14th century.
 Scibor of Radzymin (died 1390) – the bishop of Płock in 1390
 Mikołaj of Jerzyków (died after 1390) – heir of Gotartów and Jerzyków, castellan of Ostrów.
 Hanek of Chełm (died before 1397) – heir of Chełm in the second half of the 14th century, owner of the estates in Wola Chełmska, Swoszowice and Kantorowice.
 Scibor – Stibor de minori Stiboric (died around 1400) – Hungarian archbishop, Hungary around 1400.
 Marcin of Ściborz (died before 1402) – a canon of Włocławek from 1386, a canon of Płock.
 Marek of Bzów (died after 1405) – heir of land estates in Bzów and Tązów (now part of Karlino).
 Świętomir Błociszewski (died before 1408) – heir of Brodnica and Błociszewo.
 Dobiesław z Konarów and Koszyce (died around 1409) – a Kraków carpenter, a Kraków land-keeper in the years 1394–1409.
 Bernard of Gronowice (died after 1410) – chancellor of prince Władysław Opolczyk in the years 1393–1395, parish priest in Chrząszczyce, canon of Opole and Głogówek, rector of Charles University in Prague.
 Andrzej Podczaszy (died after 1410) – Trenčín voivode, Hungarian baron, lord of the Uhrovec castle (Ugrót).
 Mikołaj Purcz of Ściborz (died before 1411) – castellan of Bydgoszcz in the years 1378–1399, starost of the Kuyavia region of Inowrocław on behalf of Władysław Opolczyk before 1391.
 Dobrogost Bytkowski (died before 1413) – heir to some of the Błociszewo, Bytkowo and Luboń estates, judge of the Poznań court.
 Scibor of Sciborzyce (1347–1414) – the starost of Brest, Belarus, the provincial governor of Transylvanian and the head of the Upper Hungary (Slovak) counties, including Bratislava. He was a member of the Order of the Dragon.
 Abel Biel (died after 1414) – burgrave of Wieluń, head of Klepice, head of Inowrocław in the years 1382–1383, chamberlain of Wieluń in 1414.

15th century 

 Mikołaj of Błociszewo (died 1419) – Castellan of Santok in the years 1401–1415, a Poznań land judge in the years 1415–1419.
 Henryk Biel (died around 1424) – a canon of Gniezno from 1387.
Maciej of Bogusławice (died after 1428) – heir in Bogusławice and Jacków in the first half of the 15th century.
 Dobiesław of Koszyce and Konary (died around 1431) – heir in Koszyce and Konary in the first half of the 15th century.
 Jakub Chełmski (died before 1431) – heir of Chełm, owner of a part in Kaczkowice, prebendary in the church of St. Martin in Kraków in 1418.
 Imram Chełmski (died before 1431) – Chełm heir, owner of Kantorowice and part of Kaczkowice in the first half of the 15th century.
 Jan Błociszewski (died after 1429) – heir of estates in Brodnica, Błociszewo, Wronów, Grabianów, Luboń and others.
 Mikołaj Biel from Błeszno (died around 1432) – heir of Błeszno, Biała Wielka, Wilkowiecka, Kamyk and Kiedrzyn in the first half of the 15th century.
 Jan of Chełm (died after 1432) – Chełm heir, owner of the estates in Kantorowice, Kaczkowice and Przegorzały.
 Scibor Sciborowic (died 1434) – son of Scibor of Sciborzyce, heir of Beckov, komes, Hungarian magnate.
 Jan Chełmski of Chełm (died after 1434) – heir of Chełm, in the years 1426–1434 he was the burgrave of Kraków.
 Stanisław of Poddębice (died after 1436) – Krakow's eldership, head of Lublin, burgrave of Kraków, governor of Kraków in the years 1430–1432.
 Mikołaj Probołowski of Chełm (died 1440) – heir of Chełm, owner of Probołowice, parts in Kantorowice, Kaczkowice, Sierosławice, Mydlniki and Rząska, Kraków sub-starost, Kraków governor until 1440.
 Henryk "Indrzyc" Biel from Błeszno (died around 1442) – heir of Błeszno, courtier and messenger of king Władysław Jagiełło in 1420.
 Hanek Chełmski (died after 1443) – heir of Chełm, owner of parts of Sierosławice, Kantorowice, Gorynice, Kaczkowice, as well as Wierbki, Ziemblice and Przychody in the first half of the 15th century.
 Maciej Szczodrowski (died after 1440) – heir of Brodnica and Wronów, owner of Szczodrów in Greater Poland.
 Piotr Chełmski (died around 1446) – the burgrave of Kraków, the starost of the Nowokorczyński family in the years 1430–1432, the steward of the royal court in the years 1435–1437, the castellan of Połaniec in the years 1435–1446.
 Scibor of Koszyce and Konary (died after 1450) – heir of Konary and Koszyce Wielkie in the first half of the 15th century.
 Andrzej Brodnicki (died before 1452) – heir of Brodnica, owner of Luboń, Krajków, Karsów and Marszewo, vice-ruler of Kościan 1440–1445, burgrave of Kościan 1447–1448, vice-voivode of Kościan in 1448.
 Zygmunt Biel from Błeszno (died after 1453) – heir of Biała Mała, Libidza and Jaworzno in the Wieluń region in the first half of the 15th century.
 Mikołaj Szarlejski (died 1457) – Brzesko-kujawski substage, castellan of Inowrocław from 1438, Bydgoszcz starosta from 1441, voivode of Inowrocław from 1457, tuchola starosta from 1454, voivode of Brzescoc-kujawski in the years 1453–1457, starosta of Brodnica starosta Gniewkowski, starosta Człuchów in 1454 and in the years 1455–1456.
Jan of Chełm and Przegorzały (died around 1459) – heir of Chełm and Przegorzały, owner of a part of Wola Chełmska, Racławice, Bielanek and Filipowice, the castellan of Połaniec in the years 1447–1459.
 Jan of Jani (died 1461) – a knight from the Nowy Dwór region, co-founder of the Prussian Union, member of the Lizard Society, head of Gniew, the first Pomeranian voivode.
 Jan Rokosz (died around 1464) – Kraków burgrave and eldership, Kraków land judge from 1455.
 Dobiesław of Olewin (died around 1468) – Stężycki army, Kraków cześnik from 1437.
 Piotr of Lucjanowice (died around 1468) – Kraków land-general writer, Kraków governor from 1458.
 Scibor of Ostaszewo (died around 1470) – the heir of Ostaszewo, Mazovia in the second half of the 15th century.
 Jan Brodnicki (died after 1470) – the heir of Grabianów in Greater Poland, wrote from Brodnica.
 Mikołaj Ptaszkowski (died before 1471) – heir of Brodnica, owner of Ptaszków in Greater Poland, vice-vice-chambers of Kościański.
 Scibor Chełmski of Poniec (died 1471) – Greater Poland staroste in 1457–1460, Poznań judge, Poznań chamberlain, Malbork staroste in 1458–1459, diplomat – he led the peace of Toruń in 1466.
 Jakub Jackowski (died after 1472) – scholastic of the collegiate chapter in Opatów.
 Przecław of Dmosice (died 1474) – heir of Dmosice, head of Spiš in the years 1456–1474.
 Scibor of Bogusławice (died after 1480) – heir in Bogusławice in the second half of the 15th century.
 Jan of Nagorzyce (died after 1480) – is the first recorded in Nagórski sources, who can be associated with the Ostoje family.
Mikołaj Zarogowski (died before 1482) – Kraków councilor, mayor of Kraków, founded a chapel in the church of St. Anna in Kraków.
 Dobiesław Rokosz of Brzeziny and Koszyce Małe (died after 1486) – heir of Koszyce Małe and Brzeziny, founder of the construction of the church of St. Nicholas in Brzeziny in the second half of the 15th century.
 Marcin Poniecki (1448–1498) – heir of the town of Poniec.
 Mikołaj of Błociszewo (died before 1499) – heir of Błociszewo, Chaławy, Gaj and Grabianów, burgrave of Kościan.
 Wojciech Modliszewski (died before 1503) – heir of the estates in Modliszewo Kościelny, royal courtier.

16th century 

 Piotr Lubiatowski (died before 1511) – heir of the estates in Błociszewo, Lubiatów Wielkopolski and Mączlino.
 Katarzyna Modliszewska (died around 1512) – heiress of the property in Modliszewo Kościelny, member of the Order of St. Clare in Gniezno.
 Aleksander Irzykowski (died after 1516) – heir of Jerzyków, Kowalski and Komorów, the court of Kalisz, the land burgrave of Konin, the burgrave of the Łowicz Castle.
Stanisław Zaborowski (died 1529) – lawyer, grammar, author of the first printed treatise in Latin on Polish spelling.
 Stanisław Baranowski (died after 1531) – parish priest in Modrze, altarist in the Poznań Cathedral.
 Łukasz Popowski (died before 1547) – heir of the estates in Popowo and Mierzejewo.
 Wincenty Gajewski (died before 1564) – heir of Gaj and Grabianów and part of Błociszewo.
 Maciej Kawęczyński (died 1572) – publisher and printer, founder of the first printing house in the north-eastern part of the Polish-Lithuanian Commonwealth, activist of the Reformation in Lithuania.
 Baltazar Bzowski (1514–1574) – the owner of land estates in Bzów, Jawor's elders.
 Andrzej Blinowski (died 1581) – auxiliary bishop of Kujawsko-Pomorskie, canon of Włocławek and cantor of Kruszwica, royal secretary in 1563.
 Wojciech Jerzykowski (died after 1560) – the owner of land estates in Kozarzew, Gorazdów, Borek and Psarskie.
 Kasper Karliński (died 1590) – the starost of Olsztyn, hero of the defense of Olsztyn in 1587.
 Michał Maleczkowski (died 1592) – the Kraków governor in the years 1577–1592, the Olkusz and Chęciny Żupnik, and the great chef of the Crown.
 Erazm Gajewski (died before 1593) – heir of Gaj and parts of Błociszewo and Grabianów, the land burgrave of Kościan.
 Jan Gajewski of Błociszewo (died 1595) – heir of Gaj and parts of Błociszewo and Grabianów, owner of Grodziec, Nietrzanów, Gorzyczki and others, marshal of the coronation parliament (1588), member of the parliament, town writer of Kalisz (1566–1578), eldership and surrogator Poznań township (1578–1582), Poznań land judge (1582–1595).
 Dobrogost Baranowski (died after 1597) – heir in Kozarzewo, land burgrave of Konin.
Samuel Dubikowski (1550–1630, XV from the tribe of Oleg the Prophet) – for his knightly courage received lands in the tract Pavlovskoe (Branikozhi) near Novogrudok from Sigismund III Vasa in 1592.
 Gabriel Słoński (1520–1598) – architect and builder, mayor of the city of Kraków.
 Marcin Baranowski (died before 1601) – owner of the estate in Stanomin, writer of the land of Inowrocław.
 Michał Konstantynowicz Sumorok (died after 1603) – a Kaunas land judge in the years 1599–1603, a Kaunas land writer in the years 1580–1599.
 Stanisław Czechowicz (died around 1605) – Marshal of Hospodar in 1588, sub-starost of Samogitia before 1588.
 Abraham Mierzewski (died after 1606) – heir of a part in Mirzewo, parish priest in Goniembice, dean of Szamotuły.
 Wojciech Gajewski (died 1609) – heir of the estates of Gorzyce, Gorzyczki, Przysieka Polska, Orle, Głuchowo and others, staroste of Ujsko-Piła, courtier of King Sigismund III Vasa.

17th century 

 Gabriel Ochocki (died 1616) – a juror, councilor and mayor of the city of Krakow.
 Andrzej Mierzewski (died 1617) – parson in Pobiedziska, canon of the Poznań Cathedral chapter.
 Krzysztof Słuszka (died 1620) – Wenden voivode, courtier of Emperor Rudolf II of Habsburg.
 Marcin Szyszkowski (1554–1630) – prince of Siewier, bishop-coadjutor, bishop of Łuck, Płock and Kraków.
 Franciszek Zajerski (1561–1631) – auxiliary bishop of Lutsk.
 Michał Sędziwój (Michał Sędzimir) (1566–1636) – Polish alchemist and doctor, probably an oxygen discoverer, courtier of Emperor Rudolf II.
 Hieronim Nagórski (died 1636) – heir of Grabownica, founder of the church of St. Nicholas in Grabownica, participant in the Battle of Chocim in 1621.
 Kazimierz Siemienowicz (died after 1651) – military engineer, artillery theorist, author of the fundamental work on artillery Artis Magnae Artilleriae pars prima (Great art of artillery, part one).
 Paweł Marchocki (died 1631) – the head of Czchów in 1600, general collector of Kraków taxes in 1629, royal captain, member of parliament.
 Aleksander Kaweczyński (Kawieczyński) (died 1633) – Wilkomier Chamberlain in the years 1627–1633, marshal of the Grand Tribunal of the Grand Duchy of Lithuania] in 1633, royal courtier.
 Abraham Bzowski (born Stanisław Bzowski from Proszowice) (1567–1637) – a Dominican, representative of the Counter-Reformation movement, church historian, hagiographer and preacher.
 Jan Baranowski (died after 1641) – the righteous of the town of Łabiszyn with its adjoining areas, the Bydgoszcz and Inowrocław town writer, the Bydgoszcz town judge, the plenipotentiary of Jerzy Ossoliński, the Crown Deputy Chancellor.
 Mikołaj Szyszkowski (died 1643) – Sambian prince and bishop of Warmia in the years 1633–1643, grand secretary of the Crown, apostolic administrator of the Sambia diocese, royal secretary, abbot of Czerwińsk.
 Piotr Szyszkowski (died 1645) – marshal of the Crown Tribunal, castellan of Sącz, castellan of Wojnica, starosta of Warka, member of the Sejm in 1634.
Aleksander Słuszka (1580–1647) – voivode of Trakai in 1642–1647, voivode of Novogrudok in 1638, voivode of Minsk in 1633, castellan of Samogitia in 1628, castellan of Minsk in 1618, marshal of the Grand Tribunal of the Grand Duchy of Lithuania in 1641, the head of Rywycki, łojowski, Mozyr and Gomel.
 Adam Owsiany (died before 1649) – marshal of the Grand Tribunal of the Grand Duchy of Lithuania in 1641, a land judge in Lida in the years 1642–1643, a deputy in Lida in 1631–1643.
 Krzysztof Kazimierz Uniechowski (died after 1649) – Lithuanian instigator in 1649, secretary of His Majesty, Member of the Coronation Sejm in 1649.
 Mikołaj Szyszkowski (died 1651) – chamberlain of Wieluń in the years 1630–1650, judge of Wieluń in the years 1613–1630, royal secretary, member of the Sejm.
 Jerzy Danielewicz (1595–1652) – Catholic priest, Jesuit professor of moral theology, prefect of Jesuit schools, confessor of Prince Zygmunt Karol Radziwiłł.
 Anna Marianna Marchocka in the Teresa of Jesus convent (1603–1652) – a Carmelite nun (in 1637 she was elected superior of the order), mystic and God's Handmaid.
 Wojciech Rylski (died after 1655) – Żytomierz army in the years 1639–1655, writer of the city of Kiev, writer of the city of Żytomierz in 1640.
 Piotr Rylski (died after 1655) – land judge of Rawa in 1648, writer of Rawa lands from 1647, captain of the Rawa voivodship in 1655.
Boleslaw Dubikowski (died after 1655) – Smolensk's Deputy cup-bearer in the early to mid 1600s. His wife Anna Skopovna was a daughter of Hans Skopovny – tiun (ruler) of Samogitia (land Zhemoytskaya). They owned estates near Smolensk: Poretskoye, Stankovo, Korenkovo and Folvark Kovalev. Hans Skopovny was the son of the Royal secretary and Skerstomon derzhavtsa (tiun, owner and ruler) in 1527, Stanislav Skop from princely Dovsprung dynasty and his wife Princess Helena Andreevna Sangushko (1490–1561).
 Wojciech Gajewski (died 1657) – the castellan of Rogozin, head of Wschowa.
 Bogusław Jerzy Słuszka (died after 1658) – Lithuanian court treasurer in 1645, Lithuanian steward in 1656, Lithuanian carpenter in 1643, the starost of Rechytsa in 1639.
 Paweł Danilewicz (died after 1667) – a Vilnius land judge in the years 1649–1667, Vilnius deputy in the years 1646–1649, a teacup in Lidzki in the years 1642–1646, a Vilnius town judge in the years 1641–1646, the head of Intur in 1655, was the elector of Jan II Kazimierz Waza from the Vilnius Province.
 Jan Baranowski (died after 1668) – a colonel in the hussars of the Ukrainian banners of prince Jeremy Wiśniowiecki, the swordfish from Bracław, the Bracław stolnik. Participated, inter alia, in the defense of Zbaraż in 1649 and the battle of Beresteczek in 1651.
 Jan Stachurski (died 1669) – major general of the Crown troops, owner of the Kikół estate in the Dobrzyń region.
 Elżbieta Słuszczanka (1619–1671) – royal court marshal, crown vice-chancellor, owner of the Kazanowski Palace in Warsaw.
 Andrzej Nagórski (died after 1671) – a cavalry companion, captain of the infantry banner of the choir of the province of Lublin and Bełz, member of the election Sejm (1669).
 Gabriel Ochocki (1601–1673) – doctor of medicine and philosophy, professor of the Kraków Academy, mayor of the city of Kraków, owner of the Żabno estate with the city of Żabno.
 Zygmunt Adam Słuszka (died 1674) – the Lithuanian grand ensign in 1656, the Lithuanian court ensign in 1649, the Rzeczyca starosta in the years 1658–1672.
 Jan Aleksander Kublicki (died after 1674) – a town writer from Połack in 1672.
 Hieronim Ochocki (died 1676) – doctor of both laws, custodian of Pilica, canon and official of Wiślica, canon of the All Saints collegiate church in Kraków, apostolic protonotary, assessor in the Kraków curia, parish priest in Strożyska, Sędziszów and Słupia.
 Piotr Ochocki (died after 1681) – a city juror in Kraków, a carpenter in Grabowiec.
 Jan Ścibor Chełmski (died before 1683) – a hunter of Kraków in 1633, the starost of Kraków.
 Franciszek Ostaszewski (died 1684) – Ciechanów treasurer.
 Roman Jan Danilewicz (died 1685) – owner of the Świrany estate, pledged owner of the Korciany estate, chamberlain of Oszmiana, ensign of Oszmiana, of the Oszmiana substitute, staroste of Intur, member of the Sejm.
 Adam Karol Danilewicz (died before 1686) – a municipal judge in Vilnius.
 Stanisław Krzysztof Uniechowski (Unichowski) (died after 1686) – chamberlain of Smolensk in the years 1676–1686, land judge in Smolensk in the years 1667–1671, deputy in Smolensk in the years 1651–1667.
 Stanisław Ścibor-Bogusławski (died 1696) – canon of grace, Przemyśl, Włocławek, custodian of Wolbórz, provost from Brzozów, surrogate judge of the consistory of the Kujawsko-Pomorskie Diocese, judge, deputy to the Central Tribunal of the Crown, chancellor of Cardinal M. S. Radziejowski until 1696.
 Bogusław Aleksander Uniechowski (Unichowski) (died 1697) – voivode of Trakai from 1689, land writer of Nowogródek from 1678, marshal of the Lithuanian Tribunal of the Grand Duchy of Lithuania.
 Mikołaj Ścibor-Marchocki (died after 1697) – Przemyśl swordfish, castellan of Żarnów in 1694.
 Jan Baranowski (died 1699) – heir of Ostrołęka and Pilica, colonel of cavalry, swordfish from Bracław.
 Mikołaj Danilewicz (died after 1699) – heir to the estates of Wierzchówek, Ołseta and others, Wilkomier swordfish, Wilkomier's deputy, Wilkomier's deputy, elector of King Michał Korybut Wiśniowiecki.
 Michał Ścibor-Rylski (died 1701) – a teacup from Łęczyca, distinguished royal captain in the battle of Chocim in 1673, castellan of Gostynin.
 Józef Bogusław Słuszka (1652–1701) – the Lithuanian field hetman in the years 1685–1701, the castellan of Vilnius, the Lithuanian court marshal in 1683, the Lithuanian Grand Ensign in 1676, the Grand Lithuanian hunter in 1673, the staroste of Rzeczyca, Lanckoroński, Pinsk, Pieniny, Jezierski.
 Jan Franciszek Jerzykowski (died before 1702) – heir of Kościeszki, Białężyna, Oborzysk and others, burgrave of the town of Poznań, regent of the town of Poznań, writer of the town of Kościan.
 Stefan Jerzykowski (died before 1702) – heir of Oborzyska, burgrave of the town of Poznań.
 Michał Danilewicz (died after 1703) – heir of the estates of Średnik, Bohdanów, Sulżyn and others, head of Płotel, parliamentary commissioner in 1703.
 Jan Ochocki (died after 1705) – bachelor and master of the Krakow Academy, doctor of law, associate professor at the Faculty of Philosophy, rector (senior) of the Wawel castle school.
Katerina Dubikowska (died after 1707) – in the late 1600s was the wife of Michael Surin (his own coat of arms – derived from the coat of arms Massalski). They owned many estates in the Kiev land and Mogilev land including Gostomel. Previously, the Surins owned the Chernobyl Castle from 1548 to 1550.
 Łukasz Gajewski (died 1708) – Castellan of Santok in 1690.
 Piotr Bogusław Baranowski (died after 1709) – an officer in the hussar banner of Józef Lubomirski, took part in the wars with Turkey, from 1689 the marshal of the military confederation established near Wiśniowiec.
Michal Dubikowski (died after 1710) – a comrade of the armored regiment (heavy noble cavalry – 'hussaria'); he received from King John III (Jan Sobieski) the rank of Pinsk bridge guard (Mostovnichny) in 1692. He owned several estates in the Mozyr region, including estates Verzhbolovo (modern Virbalis, Prussia, Lithuania) and Osovets.
 Andrzej Nagórski (1643–1710) – professor of rhetoric and moral theology, prefect of Jesuit schools, missionary, rector of colleges in Kalisz and Lublin, secretary of the Polish provincial (1703–1705).
Dominik Michał Słuszka (1655–1713) – Voivode of Połack in the years 1686–1713, colonel general of the Grand Duchy of Lithuania, marshal of the Grand Tribunal of the Grand Duchy of Lithuania.

18th century 

 Karol Ścibor Marchocki (died 1720) – a hunter from Sandomierz, marshal of the Sandomierz Province in the Tarnów Confederation.
 Aleksander Ścibor Marchocki (died 1722) – castellan of Żarnów, royal colonel.
 Aleksander Józef Unichowski (died 1725) – a land judge in Minsk, a member of the Sejm coronationis of Augustus II, a commissioner for treaties with the Lithuanian army, a castellan of Samogitia.
 Antoni Świerczyński (Świrczyński) (1670–1727) – Catholic priest, Jesuit, professor of ethics and mathematics in Lublin, philosophy in Poznań and Kalisz, theology in Kraków and Lviv, prefect of studies in Kraków and Sandomierz, rector of the Jesuit college in Bydgoszcz and rector and master of novitiate in Kraków, author of books.
 Andrzej Ścibor-Bogusławski (died 1729) – instigator of the crown tribunal in 1700, town regent of Sieradz, border bailiff of Łęczyca and Sieradz in the years 1717–1729, judge of the commissioner's court in 1719, heir of the estates of Sulisławice, Włocin and Grzymaczew.
 Mikołaj Baranowski (died after 1733) – the owner of the lands in Pilica, Łękawica and Zakrzewo, judge hood from Czerski, cupbearer of Bracław.
 Franciszek Błociszewski (1671–1743) – priest, Jesuit, professor of ethics, mathematics, philosophy, canon law, positive, polemic and scholastic theology, prefect of studies in Kalisz (1718–1720) and Kraków (1720–1721) and rector of Jesuit colleges in : Krosno (1721–1724), Sandomierz (1726–1727), Toruń (1729–1732) and Jarosław (1739–1742).
 Franciszek Gajewski (1675–1734) – the Konarski Kujawy castellan in 1730, the Kościan starosta.
 Anastazy Kiedrzyński (actually Piotr Kiedrzyński (1676–1756) – Catholic priest, friar of OSPPE, priest, doctor of theology, provincial of the Order of Saint Paul the First Hermit, prior of the Wieluń monastery, at Jasna Góra (1716–1719) and at Skałka in Kraków (1722–1722 1728).
 Franciszek Stefan Danilewicz (died after 1744) – heir of the Bohdanów, Danilewicze and other estates, the Płotel staroste.
 Florian Hrebnicki (1684–1762) – Greek Catholic clergyman, suffragan of Vitebsk in 1716–1719, Archbishop of Połock, Metropolitan of Kiev from 1748.
 Onufry Danilewicz (1695–1753) – Catholic priest, Trinitarian, lecturer (professor) of philosophy and scholastic and dogmatic theology, superior (minister) of the Vilnius monastery in Antakalnis, definitor of the Polish monastic province, ascetic writer, historian and chronicler of his order.
 Franciszek Miklaszewski (died after 1750) – a Jewish judge of the Kraków voivodeship in 1728, voivodship writer, subordinate and judge of the Kraków governing bodies in the years 1729–1750.
 Franciszek Tadeusz Danilewicz (died after 1764) – ensign of Oszmiana, colonel general of the district of the Oszmiana army of the Grand Duchy of Lithuania.
 Florian Ostaszewski (died 1770) – the army of Ciechanów.
 Michał Antoni Baranowski (died after 1764) – the owner of the landed estates in Ługowa Wola, Cychry, the owner of the vogt's office in Długowola, the hood judge from Czersk, the Czersk court bailiffs, the border bailiff from the Czersk region, the hunter from the Czersk region.
 Józef Pietrzkiewicz (died after 1764) – Wiłkomier cuper, elector of Stanisław August Poniatowski from the Wiłkomier region.
 Antoni Gajewski (died 1775) – the head of Kościan and Łęczyca, castellan of Nakło.
 Nereusz Ostaszewski (born 1755) – Member of the Four-Year Sejm, chamberlain of King Stanisław August.
 Florian Baranowski (died after 1764) – cupbearer of Bracław, owner of landed estates: Pilica, Łękawica, Zakrzew, Szczyty, Brześce. He signed the election of Stanisław August Poniatowski with the Czersk land in 1764.
 Jakub Ulejski (died after 1775) – Greater Poland regiment in the Bar Confederation.
 Stanisław Ścibor-Kotkowski (died before 1776) – a Kraków land judge in 1765, a Kraków carpenter in the years 1764–1765, a Kraków swordfish in the years 1756–1764, a member of the coronation parliament in 1764 from the Kraków voivodeship.
 Franciszek Zagórski (died after 1767) – marshal of the confederation of the Kiev voivodship in the confederation of Radom in 1767, the head of the Owut district in the years 1747–1766.
 Feliks Antoni Mikorski (died after 1771) – marshal of the Central Tribunal in 1768, a Gostynian land judge in 1771, a Gostynian land writer in 1768, a town regent of Gostynin in 1752.
 Gwidon Marceli Siedliski (died after 1772) – Przemyśl land judge in 1765–1772, Przemyśl deputy in 1748–1765, judge and counselor of Przemyśl in the Bar Confederation, chamberlain of Stanisław August Poniatowski in 1764.
Lawrenty Dubikowski (died after 1773) – received the rank of Novogrudok cornet 'khorunzhy' from the Hetman of the Grand Duchy of Lithuania, Prince Mikhail Kazimir Radziwil in 1751. He owned the estates of Korytno and Załuzie in the Oshmyany district.
 Andrzej Antoni Glindzicz (died after 1782) – Grodno landsman in the years 1752–1782, Grodno sub-head.
 Krystyna Ścibor-Bogusławska (died 1783) – gifted for life by King Stanisław August Poniatowski with the head of Wągłczew in 1773.
 Jakub Ścibor-Bogusławski (died 1788) – the Bar Confederate, heir of Włocin and Grzymaczew.
 Wojciech Ścibor-Marchocki (died 1788) – the castellan of Sanok, a general-royal adjutant, cupbearer, substitute and the Trembowla army.
 Tadeusz Danilewicz (died after 1788) – heir of the estates of Gudziany, Lewszany, Piełaniszki, Skierzabola, landwójt of Troki, commissar of provisions in Troki, captain of the Trakai Province.
 Michał Danilewicz (died after 1790) – ensign of Pethory, town judge of Smolensk, elector of King Stanisław August.
 Józef Zagórski (died after 1792) – consiliar of the general confederation of the Crown in the Targowica Confederation, Lutsk chamberlain in 1773–1792, Volyn ensign in 1765–1773, Volyn swordfish in 1754–1765, armored colonel of the Crown Polna Bulawa in 1767.
 Józef Andrzej Mikorski (died 1793) – castellan of Rawa from 1791, staroste of Gostyń in 1779–1789, chamberlain of Gostyń from 1774, cupbearer of Gostyń, writer of the Crown Revenue Commission, head of Gąbin in 1789, decorated with the Order of the White Eagle , Knight of the Order of Saint Stanislaus, obtained the Prussian Count's title in 1798.
 Stanisław Józef Ochocki (died 1793), a cupman from Mozyr, deputy to the Lublin tribunal from the Łuków region, marshal of the court of the Lithuanian field hetman Józef Sosnowski, heir to the Sidaczówka and Ryszki (Ryżki) estates.
Jan Dubikowski (died after 1793) – deputy at the Minsk Seimik in 1787.
 Ignacy Piotr Ścibor-Bogusławski (1716–1793) – canon of Łęczyca, dean of Warta, builder of the church in Brzeźno, commissioner of the archbishopric of Gniezno in 1785.
 Euzebiusz Ostaszewski (1756–1794) – company commander in the Kościuszko Uprising, captain of the Crown foot guard regiment, member of the Civil and Military Council.
 Jan Zagórski (died after 1794) – a cupbearer of Włodzimierz, town judge of Krzemieniec, counselor of the general confederation of the Crown, envoy of the Volyn voivodeship to the Four-Year Sejm, counselor of the general confederation of the Crown in the Targowica Confederation, the Supreme Criminal Court sentenced him to death by hanging, eternal infamy, confiscation of property and loss of all offices.
 Józef Longin Staszewski (died after 1795) – Upicki Chamberlain in 1783–1795, Upicki Land judge in 1772–1783, Upica guard in 1765–1772, Upicki's deputy to the Four-Year Sejm in 1790, member of the Friends of the Constitution.
 Franciszek Ścibor-Bogusławski (died 1796) – captain in the Bar Confederation, ensign of the National Cavalry, deputy marshal of the Sieradz Sejmik in 1761, heir of Smaszków, Włocin and Grzymaczew.
 Jan Ostaszewski (born 1745) – ensign of Przasnysz.
 Antoni Baranowski (born 1760) – major general of the Crown forces, a Kościuszko insurgent.
 Jakub Kiedrzyński (died 1798) – owner of the Orpiszewek and Fabianów estates, burgrave of Kalisz, land judge of Kalisz.
 Tadeusz Błociszewski (died 1807), major general of the Crown troops in the years 1766–1790, member of the Four-Year Sejm, knight of the Order of St. Stanisława.
 Józefat Ochocki (died 1806) – Abbot of the Basilians in Owrucz, doctor of theology, rector of Basilian schools, diarist.
 Stanisław Kublicki (died 1809) – parliamentary commissioner, Bar Confederate, Member of the Four-Year Sejm, Lithuanian captain, colonel, playwright, poet, translator, member of the Friends of the Constitution, supporter of reforms improving the situation of the middle class and peasants.
Mikolai Dubikowski – warden and teacher of the German at the Kanev Imperial College, late 1790s.
 Bonawentura Gajewski (died after 1812) – civil and military commissar of the Kalisz region, captain of the banner of the 3rd National Cavalry Brigade until 1786.
 Dionizy Mikorski (died after 1813) – a representative from Wyszogród to the Grodno Sejm (1793), King Stanisław August's page, Knight of the Order of Saint Stanisław.
 Michał Ostaszewski (died 1816) – organizer and one of the leaders of the Bar Confederation 1768–1772 in Podkarpacie, supporter of the Constitution of 3 May, initiator of the construction of the Iwonicz-Zdrój health resort, heir of, among others Wzdowa.
 Tomasz Ostaszewski (1746–1817) – the bishop of Płock in the years 1809–1817, senator of the Duchy of Warsaw and the Kingdom of Poland, knight of the Order of St. Stanislaus.
 Sebastian Ostaszewski (1755–1826) – landowner, owner of the Wzdów and Jaćmierz estates in the Sanok region.
 Ignacy Jerzy Marchocki (1755–1827) – ensign of Trembowla, creator of the Mińkowiecki State.
 Adam Ostaszewski (1750–1829) – major of the national cavalry.
Jan Dubikowski (1750–1830) – with wife Agatha Oranska (coat of arms of the Kosciusz Oransky) owners of the Berdniki estate near Fastov, in the Kiev region. 
 Kazimierz Ostaszewski (1756–1845) – ensign of the national cavalry, owner of the Zarszyn, Posada Zarszyńska and Długie estates in the Sanok region.
Jan Duklan Ochocki (1766 / 8–1848) – diarist, chamberlain of King Stanisław August Poniatowski, deputy and judge of Żytomierz, palestrant of Żytomierz, courtier of Józef Stempkowski, voivode of Kiev.
 Feliks Rylski (1770–1823) – Major of the Polish Army, decorated with the Order of Virtuti Militari and the Legion of Honour.
 Józefa, née Ostaszewska, Fr. Łukomska (born 1785) – wife of Prince Wincenty Łukomski, owner of the Pleszka estate in the Witebsk region.

19th century 

 Mikołaj Krzywiec-Okołowicz (1762–1841) – heir of the Bechcice, Rszew, Niesięcin, Srebrna, Żabice Wielkie estates, judge of the Court of Appeal, Member of the Polish Parliament, founder of the city of Konstantynów, founder of churches in Konstantynów.
 Beda Ostaszewski (1764–1834) – prior of the Benedictine monastery in Pułtusk in 1802–1815, doctor of theology, last abbot of the monastery in Lubiń in 1815–1834.
 Józef Marchocki (1776–1850) – officer of the Galician-French army and the Duchy of Warsaw, a November insurgent.
 Jan Czeczot (1796–1847) – poet, translator, ethnographer, friend of Adam Mickiewicz, secretary of the Philomatic Society.
 Józef Ostaszewski (died 1854) – a member of the Galician States.
Jean Dubikowski (born after 1777) – Chevalier of the 17th regiment of the Polish cavalry (lancers of Brigadier general Count Michael Tyszkiewicz) in the army of the Grand Duchy of Warsaw in 1812–1815.
 Stanisław Ścibor-Bogusławski (1784–1859) – major in the 13th Line Infantry Regiment during the November uprising, decorated with the Knight's Cross of the Virtuti Militari Order, heir of the Włocin and Stok estates.
 Wincenty Danilewicz (1787–1878) – Napoleonic soldier, cavalryman, participated in the Napoleonic Wars, for which he was awarded the French Order of the Legion of Honor.
 Kazimierz Ostaszewski (1786–1855) – major of the Russian army, owner of a municipal property in Moscow.
 Ignacy Ostaszewski (1792–1840) – officer of the Polish army, participant in the Napoleonic campaign of 1812, captain in the 5th Lancers Regiment in the November uprising.
 Franciszek Gajewski (1792–1868) – colonel, adjutant of Emperor Napoleon I, knight of the Legion of Honor, participant in the November uprising, commander of the 1st Kalisz Regiment.
 Jan Kazimierz Ordyniec (1797–1863) – Polish translator, journalist, editor, poet and literary critic, activist of the Great Emigration.
 Spirydion Ostaszewski (1797–1875) – a hippologist, horse breeder, writer, collector of folk tales and legends, November insurgent.
 Eustachy Ostaszewski (1800–1831) – Polish army officer, participant in the November uprising.
 Józef Gabriel Świerczyński (1800–1858) – presiding judge at the Correctional Police Court in Kalisz, prosecutor of the Polish Criminal Court in Lublin, law teacher at the provincial gymnasium in Piotrków, collegiate counselor, member of the Noble Deputation.
 Eliasz Ostaszewski (born 1802) – philaret, student at the University of Vilnius, prisoner, diarist.
 Feliks Ostaszewski (1807–1876) – officer of the grenadier regiment in the November uprising, knight of the Order of Virtuti Militari.
 Scholastyka z Klicki Ostaszewska (1805–1862) – Polish independence activist in the Russian Partition associated with the so-called Enthusiasts striving to increase the activity of women in public life.
 Joanna née Ostaszewska Ostaszewska (1807–1849) – the owner of the Gołotczyzna and other estates in the area of Ciechanowski, wife of the landowner Józef Władysław Ostaszewski.
 Stanisław Błociszewski (1804–1888) – officer, November insurgent, received the golden cross of Virtuti Militari.
 Ignacy Napoleon Ścibor-Bogusławski (1807–1882) – parish priest from Mierzyn, participant of the January uprising.
 Teofil Ostaszewski (1807–1889) – landowner, writer, social and economic activist, author of the program of the abolition of serfdom, owner of the Wzdów, Grabownica and Klimkówka estates, member of the Galician State Parliament, participant of the Spring of Nations, marshal of the Brzozów Poviat.
 Antoni Ostaszewski (1816–1883) – physician, doctor of medicine.
 Wincenty Ścibor-Rylski (died 1885) – November insurgent, landowner.
Michal Dubikowski (died after 1897) – the Rottomier (Captain) of Rechitsa in the middle-to-late 1800s.
 Leopoldyna Horodyńska (née Ścibor-Rylska) (1816–1897) – the owner of extensive and numerous landed estates.
 Eustachy January Mateusz Ścibor-Rylski (1817–1899) – Member of the National Seym of Galicia, owner of the Czarnołoźce, Demeszkowce, Uhrynów and Tudorkowice estates.
 Edward Rylski (1821–1895) – Austrian officer, January insurgent.
 Kazimierz Błociszewski (1823–1878) – a Greater Poland insurgent of 1848, historian, author of the four-volume Universal History for Learning Youth.
 Ludwik Ostaszewski (born 1824) – insurgent, officer of the Italian army, member of the Society of the Polish National Museum in Rapperswil.
 Zygmunt Ścibor-Rylski (died 1898) – landowner, last owner of Pisarowce.
 Łukasz Solecki (1827–1900) – Przemyśl bishop 1881–1900, professor at the University of Lviv.
 Władysław Ostaszewski (1827–1863) – unit commander in the January uprising.
 August Ścibor-Rylski (died 1902) – landowner, January insurgent, clerk.
 Zygmunt Czechowicz (1831–1907) – member of the Lithuanian Provisional Governing Commission and Provincial Government of Lithuania and Belarus, exile, one of the representatives of the 19th-century Belarusian national movement.
 Jan Mioduszewski (1831–1910) – Polish painter, graduate of the St. Petersburg Academy, participant and laureate of the World Exhibition in 1867 in Paris.
 Emma Ostaszewska (hr. Załuskich Ostaszewska (née Załuski)) (1831–1912) – social and patriotic activist, pianist, owner of land estates in Wzdów and Klimkówka.
 Kornel Scibor-Rylski (Kornel Ritter Rylski von Groß-Scibor) (1835–1891) – engineer, major general of the Austro-Hungarian army.
 Jan Aleksander Karłowicz (1836–1903) – Polish ethnographer, musicologist, linguist, folklorist, member of the Academy of Learning, honorary member of the Society of the Polish National Museum in Rapperswil.
 Karolina Ostaszewskich (née Wojciechowska) (1837–1929) – Polish independence activist of secret women's organizations, courier of the January uprising of 1863.
 Antoni Teodor Ostaszewski (1837–1909) – engineer, builder of the skating bridge in Włocławek, participant in the January uprising.
 Walenty Miklaszewski (1839–1924) – professor at the Main School of Warsaw and the University of Warsaw, a leading representative of the classical school of criminal law.
Joseph Dubikowski (born 1840) – collegiate assessor in Kremenets in 1870–1876 Together with his wife Apolonia Radziminska (coat s of arms Lis)owned the estates of Berezhanka, Domaninka, Kulikovo and Vyshhorod near Kremenets.
 Władysław Chotkowski (1843–1926) – Catholic priest, Church historian, professor and rector of the Jagiellonian University, The Commander's Cross of the Order of Franz Joseph, the Commander's Cross of the Order of Polonia Restituta, the papal gold Cross Pro Ecclesia et Pontifice, the Polish Cross of Valor.
 Władysław Ostaszewski (1844–1892) – a representative of the Warsaw intelligentsia of the Young Poland period, his portrait by Władysław Podkowiński is in the collection of the National Museum in Warsaw.
 Józef Rogosz (1844–1896) – writer, publisher and journalist.
 Countess Maria Dzieduszycka (née Maria née Ostaszewska, count. Dzieduszycka (1851–1918) – a social activist, owner of the Jasionów estate in Podkarpacie.
 Maria Witkiewicz (née Pietrzkiewicz (1853–1931) – wife of Stanisław Witkiewicz, mother of Stanisław Ignacy Witkiewicz, music teacher.
 Kazimierz Franciszek Ostaszewski (1855–1936) – social activist, technologist engineer, owner of a printing house.
 Adam Ostaszewski (1860–1934) – an aviation constructor, scientist and inventor, known as Leonard from Wzdów.
 Kazimierz Ostaszewski-Barański (1862–1913) – journalist, publicist and historical writer.
 Stanisław Ostaszewski (1862–1915) – entrepreneur, industrialist, inventor and promoter of modern technologies.
 Maria née Gajewska count. Potocka (1863–1927) – heiress of the Piątkowo estate, social activist, president of the Society of Polish Landowners in Pomerania.
 Edmund Ścibor-Rylski (1867–1914) – officer, clerk, decorated with the Knight's Cross of the Order of Franz Joseph.
Mieczysław Karłowicz (1876–1909) – composer and conductor, author of over 100 songs and various orchestral works, including 6 symphonic poems.

20th century 

 Adam Mokrzecki (1856–1921) – a lieutenant general of the Polish Army, decorated with the Order of St. Włodzimierz, the Order of St. Anna, the Order of St. George, the Order of St. Stanisław, the Cross of Valor.
 Adam Hrebnicki-Doktorowicz (1858–1941) – botanist, professor of gardening in St. Petersburg.
 Tadeusz Józef Starzewski (Ostoja-Starzewski) (1860–1931) – notary public, doctor of law, president of the Chamber of Notaries in Kraków, head of the Treasury Department of the Supreme National Committee, founder of the National and State Union.
 Stefan Mokrzecki (1862–1932) – Major General of the Polish Army, decorated incl. With the Commander's Cross of the Order of Polonia Restituta, the Order of St. Włodzimierz, the Order of St. Anna, the Order of St. George, the Order of St. Stanisław, the Cross of Valor.
 Kazimierz Ostaszewski (1864–1948) – a leading breeder of racing horses in Poland, founder of breeding societies, author of the first stud books in Poland, journalist and composer.
 Zygmunt Atanazy Mokrzecki (1865–1936) – Polish entomologist, zoologist, full professor at the Warsaw University of Life Sciences, he headed the Institute of Entomology and Forest Protection in Skierniewice.
 Bronisław Ostaszewski (1867–1932) – lawyer, doctor of law, major in the Polish Army, initiator and founder of the Union of Officers of the Reserve of Southeast Territories in Lviv.
 Leon Kazimierz Ostaszewski (1868–1924) – physician, surgeon at the Prague Hospital in Warsaw.
 Bronisław Bohaterewicz (Bohatyrewicz) (1870–1940) – Lieutenant Colonel of Infantry in the Army of the Russian Empire, brigadier general of the Polish Army of the Second Republic of Poland, victim of the Katyn massacre.
 Witold Ścibor-Rylski (1871–1926) – Austro-Hungarian officer, volunteer in the Second Boer War, legionnaire, infantry colonel in the Polish Army, posthumously promoted to brigadier general, Polish community activist in the United States, social worker.
 Adam Ostaszewski (1871–1934) – president of Płock in the years 1930–1934.
 Tadeusz Rylski (1871–1943) – Polish official and academic teacher, director of the State School of Farming in Cieszyn.
 Karol Irzykowski (1873–1944) – Polish literary and film critic, poet, prose writer, playwright, film theorist, translator, chess player.
 Tadeusz Zdzisław Ścibor-Rylski (1875–1934) – major in the administration of the Polish Army, decorated with the Cross of Valor twice.
 Kazimierz Ścibor-Rylski (1875–1940) – a certified colonel of the Polish Army, a victim of the Katyn massacre, decorated, among others With the Cross of Valor – three times.
 Józef Longin Ostaszewski (1875–1942) – doctor, social activist, historian, promoter of the history and culture of northern Mazovia, publisher, journalist and painter.
 Felicja Gajewska (1877–1939) – Polish landowner, social activist, vice-president of the Society of Polish Landowners, member of the Scientific Society in Toruń.
 Juliusz Ostoja-Zagórski (1878–1919) – major in the cavalry of the Polish Legions, decorated with the Iron Cross (German Empire) and the Military Merit Cross.
 Włodzimierz Zagórski (1882–1927) – brigadier general, pilot of the Polish Army, decorated with, among others With the Commander's Cross of the Order of Polonia Restituta, the Cross of Valor.
 Zofia Rogoszówna (1881 / 1882–1921) – Polish children's writer, translator and poet. She initiated the adaptation of folk songs in children's literature.
 Janina Karłowicz (1882–1937) – teacher, organizer of girls' education, participant in the defense of Lviv in 1918.
 Władysław Ostaszewski (1882–1965) – doctor of medicine, lieutenant colonel of the Polish Army.
 Kazimierz Suchcicki (1882–1940) – priest, dean of the Polish Army of the Second Republic of Poland, posthumously appointed to the rank of brigadier general.
 Aniela Ostaszewska (1882–1937) – owner of the Klimkówka estate, author of a World War I journal describing the war in Podkarpacie.
 Kazimierz Zagórski (Casimir Ostoja Zagourski) (1883–1944) – Polish photographer and traveler.
 Józefina Alicja Rogosz, 1v. Rogosz-Zagórska, 2v. Rogosz-Pieńkowska, 3v. Rogosz-Walewska (1884–1968) – actress, poet and writer.
 Karol Zagórski (1886–1940) – infantry colonel of the Polish Army, Knight of the Virtuti Militari Order, victim of the Katyn massacre.
 Stefan Kiedrzyński (1886–1943) – Polish playwright and novelist.
 Kazimierz Ścibor-Bogusławski (1887–1949) – social activist, member of the management board of the Association of Polish Merchants and Christian Industrialists, director of the Cooperative Bank in Łódź, decorated with the Silver Cross of Merit.
 Stanisław Doktorowicz-Hrebnicki (1888–1974) – geologist and mining engineer, decorated with the Golden Cross of Merit, Officer's Cross of the Order of Polonia Restituta, Medal of the 10th Anniversary of People's Poland, Order of the Banner of Labor, 1st class and the Badge of the Millennium of the Polish State.
 Irena Porębska (née Ostaszewskich) (1889–1969) – teacher and pedagogue, director of the Tadeusz Czacki High School in Warsaw.
 Władysław Roguski (1890–1940) – Polish painter, graphic artist, fabric designer, served in the Polish Legions, decorated with the Silver Cross of the Order of Virtuti Militari.
 Bronisław Hełczyński (1890–1978) – Polish lawyer, professor at the Faculty of Law of the Jagiellonian University, social and state activist, including head of the Civil Chancellery of President Ignacy Mościcki and president of the Supreme Administrative Tribunal, founder of cross-party associations in the field of education and national culture, including founding member and president of the Polish Scientific Society Abroad, member of the authorities of the Society for the Development of Eastern Territories.
 Tadeusz Zagórski (1891–1969) – athlete, sports activist, banker, decorated with the Golden and Silver Cross of Merit.
 Henryk Ostaszewski (1892–1957) – lawyer, state official of the Second Polish Republic, voivode of Białystok.
 Tadeusz Sendzimir (1894–1989) – Polish engineer and inventor, decorated with the Officer's Cross of the Order of Polonia Restituta.
 Maksym Rylski (1895–1964) – Ukrainian poet, translator, journalist, social activist, employee of the Academy of Sciences of the USSR, honorary doctorate of the Jagiellonian University.
 Antoni Ostaszewski (1896–1946) – doctor of medical sciences, major physician of the Polish Army, decorated with the Cross of Valor, Golden Cross of Merit, Medal of Independence and the Virtuti Militari Order of the 5th class.
 Jan Świerczyński (1897–1969) – brigadier beneral of the Polish Army, participant in World War I, Polish-Bolshevik War, World War II (September Campaign, Italian Campaign).
 Stefan Ścibor-Bogusławski (1897–1978) – captain of the Polish Army of the Second Republic of Poland and the Polish Armed Forces, participant in World War I and II, heir of Wilkowice, repeatedly decorated, among others: Knight's Cross of the Order of Polonia Restituta, Cross of Valor, Silver Cross of Merit, Monte Cassino Commemorative Cross, Star for the War of 1939–1945, Star of Italy, Medal of King George VI for the War of 1939–1945.
 Zygmunt Rylski (ps. "Grzegorz", "Hańcza")]] (1898–1945) – lieutenant colonel of the Polish Army, decorated with, inter alia, With the Silver Cross of the Virtuti Militari War Order, three times with the Cross of Valor.
 Tadeusz Józefat Ścibor-Bogusławski (1899–1992) – lieutenant of the Polish Army, decorated with the Cross of Valor, heir of Wilkowice.
Władysław Ścibor-Bogusławski (1902–1945) – participant in the Warsaw uprising (aka "Łajdus"), decorated with the Home Army Cross, Medal of the Polish Army (four times), the Warsaw Uprising Cross, heir of Wilkowice.
Faust Dubikowski (1902–1982) – chief veterinarian of the Gorodotsky district of the Lviv region from 1946 to 1963, a military doctor of the 3rd rank (reserve captain). Awards: The victory over Germany, the capture of Budapest, and For the victory over Japan.
 Stanisław Ostoja-Chrostowski pseudonym "Director", "Just", "Corvette" (1897–1947) – sculptor, painter and graphic artist, professor and rector of the Academy of Fine Arts in Warsaw, head of Department 999 of the II Information and Intelligence Department of the Home Army headquarters.
 Zofia Tarnowska née Ostaszewska (1902–1982) – social and economic activist, breeder of sports horses, wife of count Jan Tytus Tarnowski from Chorzelów.
 Roman Ostaszewski (1903–1940) – politician, member of the Sejm of the 5th term in the Second Polish Republic in the years 1938–1939, one of the victims of the Katyn massacre.
 Antoni Uniechowski (1903–1976) – Polish cartoonist, decorated with, inter alia, With the Knight's Cross of the Order of Polonia Restituta and the Medal of the 10th Anniversary of People's Poland.
 Karola Uniechowska (1904–1955) – a volunteer in the Women's Auxiliary Service, during World War II a nurse in military hospitals, decorated with the Army Medal, Silver Cross of Merit, Monte Cassino Commemorative Cross, Star for the War of 1939–1945 and Star of Italy.
 Eugeniusz Czechowicz (1904–1964) – Member of the Legislative Sejm (1947–1952) on behalf of the Democratic Party from the Opole district, member of the Union of Participants in the Armed Struggle for Independence and Democracy.
 Józef Ostaszewski (1904–1989) – engineer, scientist, one of the leading Polish specialists in the field of automatic oil extraction.
 Jan Ostaszewski (1905–1974) – activist of Polish emigration, lawyer, sociologist, lecturer at the School of Political and Social Sciences in London.
 Yolanda Ostaszewska (1907–2002) – teacher, violinist, living and working in Paris.
 Zofia Uniechowska (Zofia Döllinger) (1909–1993) – certified nurse-midwife, during World War II she participated in the Home Army conspiracy, decorated with the Silver Cross of the Order of Virtuti Militari, Knight's Cross of the Order of Polonia Restituta, Order of the Cross of Grunwald, Medal of Victory and Freedom, Partisan Cross and the Warsaw Uprising Cross.
 Wanda Ostaszewska (née Boruckie (1909–1994) – activist of the Polish independence underground, liaison officer of the Home Army intelligence, repressed by the communist authorities after World War II.
 Piotr Ostaszewski (1910–1965) – major pilot of the Polish Air Force, participant in the Battle of Britain in the 609th RAF Fighter Squadron, captain (flight lieutenant) of the RAF.
 Izabella Zielińska ( (1910–2017) – pianist, teacher.
 Adam Kozłowiecki, SJ (1911–2007) – Roman Catholic priest, Jesuit, missionary, metropolitan archbishop of Lusakia in 1959–1969, cardinal-priest from 1998.
 Włodzimierz Ścibor-Rylski (1914–1939) – second lieutenant in the cavalry reserve of the Polish Army, Catholic activist, lawyer.
 Zbigniew Ścibor-Rylski, ps. "Motyl", "Stanisław" (1917–2018) – officer of the Home Army, brigadier general of the Polish Army, in 2004–2014 secretary of the Chapter of the Virtuti Militari War Order, founding member and president of the Main Board of the Warsaw Insurgents Association in 1989–1994 and 1997–1 2018.
 Tadeusz Ostaszewski (1918–2003) – sculptor, professor at the Krakow Academy of Fine Arts, Knight of the Virtuti Militari Order for his participation in the September Campaign.
 Jerzy Ostaszewski (1919–1943) – a soldier of the Kedyw of the Home Army, the hero of Jan Józef Szczepański's essay In the service of the Great Shipowner, shot by the Germans in Warsaw in 1943.
 Grażyna Chrostowska (1921–1942) – Polish poet, activist of the underground during World War II.
 Ludmiła Szarkowska (née Ludmiła Ostaszewska Szarkowska) (1921–1965) – biochemist, Associate Professor dr hab. at the Institute of Biochemistry and Biophysics of the Polish Academy of Sciences.
 Alina Hejnowicz (née Alina née Ostaszewskich Hejnowicz) (1926–2010) – botanist, doc. dr hab, at the Institute of Dendrology of the Polish Academy of Sciences.
 Stanisław Ostoja-Kotkowski (Stan Ostoja-Kotkowski) (1922–1994) – 'sound and image' producer, painter, sculptor, stage designer, photographer, decorated with the Order of Australia and the honorary Meritorious of Polish Culture badge.
 Zofia Danilewicz-Stysiak (1922–2013) – dentist, professor, dr hab, n. med., director Of the Institute of Dentistry of the Medical Academy of Łódź.
 Lech Włodzimierz Bogusławski (1922–2013) – participant in the September 1939 campaign, secretary general of the Association of Polish Papermakers in 1974–1982, decorated with the Golden and Silver Cross of Merit, Knight's Cross of the Order of Polonia Restituta, Medal for Warsaw, gold and silver Badge of Honour NOT.
 Andrzej Kaczor (born Zbigniew Rylski), ps. "Andrzej", "Brzoza", (born 1923) – major of the Polish Army, decorated, among others, With the Silver Cross of the Virtuti Militari War Order, the Officer's Cross of the Order of Polonia Restituta, and the Cross of Valor – twice.
 Janusz Wojciech Bogusławski (born 1925) – doctor of technical sciences, director of the Central Laboratory of Wool Industry in Łódź in 1973, decorated with the golden Cross of Merit, golden Badge of NOT and SWP, honorary badge of the City of Łódź and the Bielsko Province.
 Andrzej Zagórski pseudonym "Mścisław" (1926–2007) – historian, soldier of the Home Army, decorated, inter alia, The Cross of Valor, the Gold Cross of Merit.
 Jerzy Józef Ostoja-Koźniewski (1926–2014) – Polish émigré activist, Minister of the Treasury in the last Polish government in exile (1989–1990).
 Aleksander Ścibor-Rylski (1928–1983) – Polish writer, director and screenwriter, decorated with, among others, Commander's Cross of the Order of Polonia Restituta.
 Halina Chrostowska (1929–1990) – graphic artist, cartoonist, educator, artistic activist.
 Andrzej Antoni Ostoja-Owsiany (1931–2008) – politician and writer, activist of the democratic opposition during the Polish People's Republic, chairman of the City Council in Łódź of the first term (1990–1994), member of the second and fourth term Sejm.
 Roman Henryk Bańkowski (1932–2004) – poet, journalist, cultural and social activist, decorated with the Silver Cross of Merit.
 Kazimierz Tumiłowicz (1932–2008) – Polish veteran activist, co-founder of the Siberian Union, member of the National City Council in Gorzów Wielkopolski.
Arnold Dubikowski (born 1938) – submariner-saboteur (school of P. Sudoplatov), personal security of Marshal Zhukov, reserve colonel.
 Jacek Ostaszewski (born 1944) – musician (double bass player and flutist), composer, theater director.
 Eustachy Rylski (born 1944) – prose writer, playwright, screenwriter, laureate of the Józef Mackiewicz and the City of Warsaw Literary Award, decorated with the Gloria Artis Medal for Merit to Culture.
Leonid Dubikowski (1944–2012) – Scholar, Public person, chorus man. PhD (technical sciences), scientist, author of more than 70 scientific papers and 30 scientific discoveries, worked in the system of the Academy of Sciences of the Ukrainian SSR (and NAS of Ukraine): Institute of Cybernetics, Institute of Problems of Materials Science, Institute for Metal Physics. 
 Adam Jerzy Ostaszewski (born 1949) – mathematician, professor at the London School of Economics, social activist, member and chairman of the Polish Social and Cultural Association in London.
 Piotr Witold Ostaszewski (born 1950) – scientist, professor of veterinary sciences.
 Paweł Ostaszewski (born 1963) – professor at the Faculty of Psychology at the University of Warsaw and at SWPS.
 Piotr Ostaszewski (born 1964) – historian, political scientist and Americanist from the Warsaw School of Economics (SGH), since 2017 the Polish ambassador to South Korea.
 Rafał Marian Ścibor-Bogusławski, visual artist, designer of industrial forms, journalist, president of the Ostoja Family Association, member of the editorial board of Na Sieradzkich Szlakach, member of the Wieluń Scientific Society, awarded many times, including 1st prize for the design of the Polish Radio Katowice logo, 2nd prize at the International WRO Festival.
 Maja Ostaszewska (born 1972) – theater and film Actor, two-time winner of the Eagle (Orła) for leading female roles in the films Jack Strong and Body/Ciała.

Modern times 
Currently, the Ostoja (Moścics) clam is organized by the Ostoja Family Association. In 2012, the Association was registered with the District Court in Rzeszów. The main goals of the Association (according to the statute) are: integration of Ostoja families and carrying out activities aimed at continuing family traditions, supporting Ostoja families, in particular studying youth, and providing material help to people in a particularly difficult life situation. In the years 2012–2017, five meetings of members and supporters of the Ostoja Family Association were held in Dwór Ostoya, in Jasionka near Rzeszów.

See also 
 Ostoja CoA
 Baranowski CoA Ostoja
Biel CoA Ostoja
 Błociszewski CoA Ostoja
 Bogusławski CoA Ostoja
 Bzowski CoA Ostoja
 Danilewicz CoA Ostoja
 Dubikowski CoA Ostoja
 Gajewski CoA Ostoja
 Jerzykowski CoA Ostoja
 Kiedrzynski CoA Ostoja
 Marchocki CoA Ostoja
 Mierzewski CoA Ostoja
Modliszewski CoA Ostoja
 Nagorski CoA Ostoja
 Ochocki CoA Ostoja
 Ostaszewscy herbu Ostoja
 Potoccy herbu Ostoja
 Świerczyńscy herbu Ostoja
 Zagórscy
 Ród heraldyczny
 Ród Awdańców
 Ród Duninów
 Ród Gryfitów
 Ród Kurów
 Ród Nałęczów
 Ród Odrowążów

Footnote

Bibliography 

 A. Boniecki, Herbarz Polski, t. 1–16, Warszawa 1899–1913.
 R. Kalinowski, Protoheraldyczny znak na portalu kościoła w Wysocicach a historia herbu Ostoja w średniowieczu, Rocznik Polskiego Towarzystwa Heraldycznego nowej serii, t. XV (XXVI), Warszawa 2016.
 K. Niesiecki, Herbarz Polski, wyd. J.N. Bobrowicz, t. 1–10, Lipsk 1839–1845.
 O. Odnorożenko, Ukraińska i ruska elita, Kijów, 2011.
 F. Piekosiński, Rycerstwo polskie wieków średnich, t. 1–3, Kraków 1896–1901.
 Słownik historyczno-geograficzny ziem polskich w średniowieczu.
 J. Sperka, Otoczenie Władysława Opolczyka w latach 1370–1401, Katowice 2006.
 T. Sulimirski, Sarmaci, PIW, Warszawa 1979.
 J. Szymański, Herbarz średniowiecznego rycerstwa polskiego, Warszawa 1993.
 J. Szymański, Herbarz rycerstwa polskiego z XVI wieku, Warszawa: DiG, 2001.
S. Dubikowski, Palimpsest of the Gods, Kiev, 2020.
Ros Kan. The Story of one kin. Kiev, 2021.

Polish knighthood families